Sucker Brook is a river located in Seneca County, New York. It flows into Seneca River by Seneca Falls, New York.

References

Rivers of Seneca County, New York
Rivers of New York (state)